Calyptrosciadium is a genus of flowering plant in the family Apiaceae. It is native to Iran and Afghanistan.

Species
, Plants of the World Online accepted two species:
Calyptrosciadium bungei (Boiss.) Pimenov, syn. Calyptrosciadium polycladum
Calyptrosciadium rechingeri Pimenov & Kljuykov

References 

Apioideae
Apioideae genera